is a former Japanese football player. He played for Japan national team.

Club career
Ochiai was born in Saitama on 28 February 1946. After graduating from high school, he joined Toshiba in 1964. He played at offensive position. In 1966, he moved to his local club Mitsubishi Motors played in Japan Soccer League (JSL). He played in all 260 matches in the league until 1981. In 1969, he became a top scorer and the club won the champions at JSL first time. In the 1970s he was converted to defensive position. In 1973, the club won JSL and Emperor's Cup. In 1978, the club won all three major title in Japan; JSL, JSL Cup, Emperor's Cup and he was selected Japanese Footballer of the Year awards. He retired in 1984. He played 267 games and scored 56 goals in the league. This 267 games is the second record in JSL after Yoshikazu Nagai (272 games). He was selected Best Eleven 10 times included for 9 years in a row (1973-1981). The club won the league champions 2 times, JSL Cup 2 times and Emperor's Cup 4 times.

National team career
In September 1974, Ochiai was selected Japan national team for 1974 Asian Games. At this competition, on 7 September, he debuted against Israel. After his debut, he played in most games included 1976 Summer Olympics qualification, 1978 World Cup qualification and 1978 Asian Games. In 1980, 1980 Summer Olympics qualification was his last game for Japan. He played 63 games and scored 9 goals for Japan until 1980.

Coaching career
After retirement, in 1988, Ochiai became coach for Japan national team under manager Kenzo Yokoyama was team mate at Mitsubishi Motors. In 1992, Ochiai became a coach for Urawa Reds (former Mitsubishi Motors) under manager Takaji Mori.

In 2010, Ochiai was selected Japan Football Hall of Fame.

Club statistics

National team statistics

Personal honors
Japan Soccer League Top Scorer - 1969
Japanese Footballer of the Year - 1978
Japan Soccer League Best Eleven: (10) 1969, 1973, 1974, 1975, 1976, 1977, 1978, 1979, 1980, 1981

References

External links
 
 Japan National Football Team Database
Japan Football Hall of Fame at Japan Football Association

1946 births
Living people
Association football people from Saitama Prefecture
Japanese footballers
Japan international footballers
Japan Soccer League players
Hokkaido Consadole Sapporo players
Urawa Red Diamonds players
Footballers at the 1974 Asian Games
Footballers at the 1978 Asian Games
Association football defenders
Association football midfielders
Asian Games competitors for Japan